Karen Olivo (born August 7, 1976) is an American stage and television actor, theater educator, and singer.

In 2008, Olivo originated the role of Vanessa in In the Heights on Broadway. The following year, they won the 2009 Tony Award for Best Featured Actress in a Musical for their performance as Anita in a revival of West Side Story. Olivo is the first and only actor to win a Tony Award for a performance in West Side Story. From 2016 to 2017, Olivo portrayed the role of Angelica Schuyler in the Chicago production of Hamilton. In 2019, Olivo originated the leading role of Satine in the Broadway adaptation of Moulin Rouge! and was nominated for a Tony Award for Best Actress in a Musical.

Early life
Olivo was born on August 7, 1976, in the South Bronx, New York City. Olivo's father is of Puerto Rican and Native American descent, and their mother is of Dominican and Chinese descent. They were raised in Bartow, Florida and attended the Lois Cowles Harrison Center for the Visual and Performing Arts in nearby Lakeland, Florida, and later the University of Cincinnati – College-Conservatory of Music. They left school before their final year to join the original Broadway production of Rent.

Career

1997–2006: Early career and Broadway debut
Olivo began their professional career in 1997 when they joined the original Broadway production of Rent. They joined as a replacement swing, also understudying the roles of Mimi and Maureen. The following year they joined the first national tour of Rent, dubbed the "Angel Tour", as a replacement swing once again. In late 1998, Olivo began playing Mimi on the tour, and they continued in the role until leaving the show in January 1999. They moved back to New York City in 1999 but did not receive any roles outside of a small part in As the World Turns before joining the regional try-out of the musical Brooklyn in 2003. Before Brooklyn transferred to Broadway the following Fall, Olivo took part of a regional staging of Children of Eden and filmed guest roles for All My Children and Law & Order. The musical Brooklyn open on Broadway in October 2004 and closed in June 2005. Following its closure, Olivo joined the cast of the Brazilian-themed off-Broadway musical Miracle Brothers, which closed in October 2005. The following year they had small roles in NBC's Conviction and the independent film Adrift in Manhattan, which premiered at the Sundance Film Festival in 2007.

2007–2012: Prominence on Broadway

In the Heights 
In 2008, In the Heights opened on Broadway. Olivo starred as Vanessa, opposite Lin-Manuel Miranda.

West Side Story 
In 2009, Olivo won a Tony Award for their performance as Anita in the Broadway revival of West Side Story. They were also nominated for both a Drama Desk and an Outer Critic's Circle Award for their critically acclaimed performance as Anita. They earned their second Astaire Award nomination for Best Female Dancer for their performance in West Side Story, after previously winning the same award in 2008 for their performance in In the Heights. They were contracted with West Side Story at the Palace through 2010. During the May 8, 2010, matinee performance of West Side Story, Olivo broke their foot. Anita standby Natalie Cortez performed the role until the show's closure.

Olivo then took part in the world premiere of By the Way, Meet Vera Stark at off-Broadway's Second Stage Theater. Written by Pulitzer Prize-winning playwright Lynn Nottage, the play "draws upon the screwball films of the 1930s to take a funny and irreverent look at racial stereotypes in Hollywood."

Film and television
Olivo had a recurring role in The Good Wife on CBS. They played wealthy law student Giada Cabrini, a potential love interest of firm partner Will Gardner (Josh Charles). Olivo was a series regular in the second season of NBC's Harry's Law, playing "hot shot lawyer" Cassie Reynolds hired by Kathy Bates' character.

Olivo also appeared as Isabelle Perez, a woman who was unknowingly sterilized in the Law & Order episode "Birthright". They also appear in the spin-off series Law & Order: Special Victims Unit as Jennifer Benitez in an episode titled "Loophole". They later appeared in Law & Order: Special Victims Unit as Yelina Muñoz in an episode titled "October Sunrise".

Olivo has had several roles in movies, including Make Yourself at Home, The New Twenty, Shanghai Hotel, and The Orphan Killer.

2013–present: Break from acting and return to theater 
On March 18, 2013, Olivo announced on their website that they were taking a break from acting, saying "with this knowledge I start a new chapter. I leave behind the actor and I start learning how to be me." During this period, they moved to Madison, Wisconsin, where they taught classes for the UW–Madison theater department and became involved in the local theater scene, which included opening a private studio to coach young performers.

They returned to professional acting the following year with New York City Center's Encores! production of the Jonathan Larson musical tick, tick... BOOM! alongside fellow Hamilton alumni Lin-Manuel Miranda and Leslie Odom Jr. in June 2014 off-Broadway.

On July 13, 2016, it was announced that Olivo would star as Angelica Schuyler in the Chicago production of Hamilton. They were part of the cast from October 19, 2016, until August 6, 2017. They stated they intended to pursue teaching after leaving the production, stating that "I'm leaving the spotlight to make sure others find theirs". In February 2018, Olivo played Florence Vassy in the Kennedy Center's revival of the musical Chess.

Moulin Rouge! 

On July 25, 2019, Olivo starred in the premiere of the Broadway production of the jukebox musical Moulin Rouge! in New York City. They continued to perform their role in the show at the Al Hirschfeld Theatre for an open-ended run. On October 15, 2020, Olivo was nominated for a Tony Award for Best Leading Actress in a Musical. On April 14, 2021, Olivo announced they wouldn't return to the show once it reopens as a protest of the industry's silence on the allegations against producer Scott Rudin. In an Instagram video, Olivo stated, "Social justice is more important than being the sparkling diamond."

In December 2021, Olivo joined We Won't Sleep, a bio-musical based on the life of Jeannette Rankin. Industry readings of the production took place on December 17 and 18, 2021 in New York City. The world premiere was set to open in May 2022 at Signature Theatre in Arlington, Virginia, but was cancelled due to the COVID-19 pandemic.

Podcasts

On July 18, 2021, Olivo appeared on a podcast entitled Noah's Corner, previously Rye's Little Corner, on episode 19, titled "Dreams Come True Bitches". On the episode, Karen was interviewed by co-hosts Noah Grace and Nellie. They spoke about their time in In the Heights and Moulin Rouge! as well as their album, Leave.

Northwestern University

In 2022, Olivo relocated to Evanston, IL to work as an associate professor at Northwestern University, where they serve as the head of music theatre.

Personal life 
Olivo is married to Jim Uphoff, with whom they have two step-children. Olivo and Uphoff, a marketing manager and former New York theater sound technician, married in September 2014. Until 2012, Olivo was married to Broadway actor Matt Caplan.

In 2013, while taking a break from acting, Olivo moved to Madison, Wisconsin, where they and Uphoff share a home they call their "home base". Both Olivo and their husband have family in Madison. Olivo has previously lived in Hell's Kitchen, Manhattan, Brooklyn, and Los Angeles.

In 2021, Olivo announced via Instagram that they are non-binary and use they/them pronouns.

Theatre credits

Awards and nominations

References

External links
 Karen on "The Theatre Podcast with Alan Seales"
 Karen on "And the Tony Goes To...." Podcast
 Broadway.com Star Profile
 Broadwayworld.com Profile
 
 
 Diva Talk: Karen Olivo

20th-century American actors
21st-century American actors
1976 births
American stage actors
American television actors
Living people
Tony Award winners
American people of Dominican Republic descent
American people of Puerto Rican descent
American people of Chinese descent
People from Bartow, Florida
People from Manhattan
21st-century LGBT people
LGBT people from New York (state)
American non-binary actors